Home is Procol Harum's fourth album, released in 1970. With the departure of organist Matthew Fisher and bassist David Knights and the addition of the remaining musicians' (Gary Brooker, B. J. Wilson and Robin Trower) former bandmate bassist/organist Chris Copping from the Paramounts, Procol Harum became, to all intents and purposes, the Paramounts again in all but name. The purpose of bringing in Copping was to return some of the R&B sound to the band that they had had with their previous incarnation.

The initial sessions were performed in London at Trident Studios in the autumn of 1969 under the supervision of former organist Matthew Fisher, who had also produced the band's previous album. Unhappy with the sound and performances, the band scrapped the Trident sessions and began again in February 1970 with producer Chris Thomas and engineer Jeff Jarratt at Abbey Road Studios. Once the album was completed, it was decided that the cover would be a parody of a British edition of the board game snakes and ladders, featuring members of the band.

When the album was released in June 1970 it charted at No. 34 in the U.S. and No. 49 in the UK; it made the Danish Top 10, peaking at No. 6. The album was preceded by the single "Whiskey Train", written by guitarist Robin Trower with lyricist Keith Reid.

Track listing
All songs written by Gary Brooker and Keith Reid except where noted.

Salvo/Fly reissue 2009
In 2009 Salvo reissued the Procol Harum catalogue and included bonus tracks for each album. "Home" included two bonus tracks selected and approved by Gary Brooker and Keith Reid, "Whaling Stories" and "Still There'll Be More". The two bonus tracks are work-in-progress mixes that lack the final overdubs from the completed versions.

Charts

Personnel
Procol Harum
Gary Brooker – piano, vocals
Robin Trower – guitar
Chris Copping – organ, bass
B. J. Wilson – drums
Keith Reid – lyrics
Technical
Jeff Jarratt - recording engineer
Helmut Hastenteufel - sleeve design

References

External links
 ProcolHarum.com – ProcolHarum.com's page on this album

Procol Harum albums
1970 albums
Albums produced by Chris Thomas (record producer)
Regal Zonophone Records albums
A&M Records albums
Polydor Records albums
Repertoire Records albums